Rocco Amboni (born 12 October 1959) is an Italian gymnast. He competed in seven events at the 1984 Summer Olympics.

References

External links
 

1959 births
Living people
Italian male artistic gymnasts
Olympic gymnasts of Italy
Gymnasts at the 1984 Summer Olympics
Sportspeople from the Province of Bergamo
20th-century Italian people